Damian Montagu is a British composer, music producer and songwriter. Based in West Sussex, his work is wide-ranging and he has twice topped the iTunes Classical Singles Chart.

Career

Following an Arts degree at UEA, Damian Montagu began working in television (LWT and Planet 24) and marketing for four years. In 1997, he co-founded the music production company Montagu Bourcier, where he composed and produced music for commercials, films, documentaries, and multimedia projects. The agency quickly became one of London's leading composition and sound design companies. Here he composed and produced music on a multitude of brand campaigns, including Audi, BMW, Diesel, Dunhill, RBS and Sony.

His film scores include The Cookie Thief (Palme d'Or nominated) and Subterrain, which was a collaboration with Michael Nyman. Additionally, he has created scores for award-winning work such as Football (starring Helena Bonham-Carter and directed by Gaby Dellal). Damian has produced scores for The South Bank Show, and series as varied as Geo (a 20 part series for Arte television) and The Science of Beauty starring Sharon Stone.

In 2006, together with David Hill, the founder of Nuphonic Records, Damian formed Radial Music, a composition and music supervision company working with major advertising agencies and also with Disney, for whom Radial supervised musical content of its video games.

In 2007, he produced an album project and a new solo project titled A Long Way from Somewhere for Damian Katkhuda, founder of the band Obi and later that year produced a track to raise HIV and AIDS awareness in Cape Verde.

In 2010, Damian produced Wrong Side of the Dream, the second album of the singer Dawn Kinnard.

"Empty Ocean", a song that he co-wrote and recorded with the Shetland artist Lise Sinclair, inspired the 2009 programme with the same name, part of the award-winning Between the Ears series of BBC Radio 3 (Damian was commissioned to create the suite of music for this programme).

In 2013, Damian co-wrote and produced the No.1 Classical Chart hit "Waiting for You", featuring Victoria Beaumont, with Jonathan Goldstein and Felix Hagan.

In 2015 Damian launched a new music label, Moonshot Music. The first signing artist was Jahméne, whose 2nd album Unfathomable Phantasmagoria was released in September 2016. Damian produced eight tracks on the album, including the song "I Wish" which was chosen as the Official song for Peace One Day 2016. He also produced the tracks with the actor Samuel L. Jackson narrating. Damian co-wrote the song "Forever & Eternity" with Jahméne Douglas and Charlie J Perry, which was performed live at the 2016 Mobo Awards Pre Show.

In March 2016, Damian released the first single, "The Path towards Tomorrow" from the forthcoming debut album, In A South Downs Way. The single reached the Number 1 spot in the UK Classical iTunes charts and has been played on BBC Radio 3 and 4 and was also performed at the Glastonbury Festival. The album celebrates Damian's love of the South Downs in Sussex and was composed as he walked in the surrounding countryside. The actor Hugh Bonneville has contributed and narrated written reflections on the album itself. After release in June 2016 through Decca Records, the full album In A South Downs Way reached the top position in the Official UK Specialist Classical Charts.

In A South Downs Way is the first of a planned series of albums under the banner Walk upon England, a project created by Damian with ex-Paul Weller sideman Stewart Prosser.  The series is developed as a collection of evocative albums created by composers and writers who find their inspiration in walking its most beautiful and unspoiled landscapes. Walk Upon England celebrates the English countryside as a source of creativity and self-expression.

Damian continues to write and produce music at his own Moonshot Studios in West Sussex.

Discography

 (2007) A Long Way from Somewhere (musician: Damian Katkhuda)
 (2010) Wrong Side Of The Dream (musician: Dawn Kinnard)
 (2016) Unfathomable Phantasmagoria (musician: Jahméne)
 (2016) In A South Downs Way

References

External links
Walk upon England project

English male composers
British film score composers
English film score composers
English male film score composers
British classical composers
British male classical composers
English classical composers
21st-century classical composers
20th-century classical composers
English classical musicians
Year of birth missing (living people)
Living people
20th-century English composers
21st-century English composers
20th-century British male musicians
21st-century British male musicians